The XVth Mediterranean Games Almería 2005 (XV Juegos del Mediterráneo 2005 in Spanish), commonly known as the 2005 Mediterranean Games, were the 15th Mediterranean Games. The Games were held in Almería, Spain over 10 days, from 24 June to 3 July 2005, where 3,203 athletes (2,126 men and 1,077 women) from 21 countries participated. There were a total of 258 medal events from 27 different sports.

Nations

  Albania
  Algeria
  Bosnia and Herzegovina
  Croatia
  Cyprus
  Egypt
  France
  Greece
  Italy
  Lebanon
  Libya
  Malta
  Monaco
  Morocco
  San Marino
  Serbia and Montenegro
  Slovenia
  Spain
  Syria
  Tunisia
  Turkey

Sports

Competitors

Medal table
The rankings sort by the number of gold medals earned by a country. The number of silvers is taken into consideration next and then the number of bronze. Equal ranking is given and they are listed alphabetically if after the above, countries are still tied. This follows the system used by the IOC, IAAF and BBC.

Competition venues
Almería
 Mediterranean Stadium (Athletics, Handisports, Football)
 Mediterranean Sports Palace (Gymnastics, Volleyball)
 Las Almadrabillas Sports Centre (Swimming, Handisports, Water polo)
 "Moisés Ruiz" Sports Hall of the Diputación (Gymnastics, Volleyball)
 Mediterranean Village Golf Course (Golf)
 Almería Equestrian Club (Equestrian sports)
 "Rafael Florido" Sports Hall (Karate, Judo)
 "Emilio Campra" Youth Stadium (Archery)
 "Antonio Rivera" Youth Sports Hall (Weightlifting)
 Club de Mar (Sailing)
 Bullring (Bowls)
 El Palmeral Beach Volleyball Stadium (Beach Volleyball)
 Los Ángeles Sports Hall (Boxing)

Cuevas del Almanzora
 Cuevas del Almanzora Canal  (Rowing, Canoe-Kayak)

El Ejido
 El Ejido Stadium (Football)
 El Ejido Sports Hall (Basketball)
 Las Norias Sports Hall (Volleyball)

Gádor
 Mediterranean Games Shooting Centre (Shooting)

Huércal de Almería
 Almería Tennis Club (Tennis)
 Huércal de Almería Sports Hall (Wrestling)

Roquetas de Mar
 "Antonio Peroles" Stadium (Football)
 "Infanta Cristina" Sports Hall (Handball)
 "Máximo Cuervo" Sports Hall (Table tennis, Fencing)

Vícar
 Vícar Stadium (Football)
 Vícar Sports Hall (Handball)

Mascot
The mascot is a multicolored Indalo, which is a cave painting possibly representing a man holding an arch over his head. Indalete, who was inspired by this ancestral figure, has a kind, likeable and very youthful appearance.

References
 Almeria 2005 results

External links
 Almeria 2005 official website

See also
Mediterranean Games Athletic results at gbrathletics website

 
M
M
M
Multi-sport events in Spain
Sport in Almería
Mediterranean Games by year
June 2005 sports events in Europe
July 2005 sports events in Europe